José Henrique da Silva Dourado (born 15 September 1989), known as Henrique Dourado or simply Henrique, is a Brazilian footballer who plays as a forward.

Career

Early career
Born in São Paulo, Henrique made his senior debut with Guarulhos, in the 2008 Campeonato Paulista Segunda Divisão (state league fourth division). In the following year, he joined Lemense in the same category, and scored 14 goals in the 2009 Paulista Segunda Divisão.

In 2010, Henrique signed a contract with União São João. In August 2011, he joined Santo André. He made his debut for the club on 21 August, against Joinville, and scored a goal almost a month later, against Brasil de Pelotas.

In September, Henrique left Santo André and joined Cianorte. A year later, he joined Chapecoense. He helped the team to promotion, scoring 5 goals in only 8 matches. In December 2012, he signed a contract with Mogi Mirim. He made his Sapo debut on 20 January 2013, against Ponte Preta. He scored his first goal on the 31st, against Corinthians. On 27 April, he scored a hat-trick in a 6-0 routing against Botafogo-SP.

Santos
On 21 May 2013, Henrique signed a one-year loan deal with Santos, with his rights being assigned to Mirassol. Five days later, he made Peixe - and Série A - debut, in a 0-0 draw against Flamengo.

Portuguesa
On 9 September 2013, after only three league appearances for Santos, Henrique signed with Portuguesa. He scored three goals during the season, with Portuguesa being relegated despite finishing in 12th.

Palmeiras
After being the topscorer of Lusa in 2014 Campeonato Paulista, Henrique joined Palmeiras on 28 April 2014, on loan until the end of the year.

Cruzeiro / Vitória de Guimarães
A disappointing spell at Cruzeiro saw Henrique move to Portuguese club Vitória de Guimarães for the 2015/16 season, where he scored 12 goals in 30 games.

Fluminense
On 30 June 2016, Henrique returned to Brazil with Fluminense. The striker scored a penalty in normal time to help secure a 3-3 draw in the final of the 2017 Taça Guanabara, against bitter rivals Flamengo. Fluminense went on to win in the penalty shootout.

Playing for Fluminense, he was the top scorer of Campeonato Brasileiro Série A in 2017, along with Jô (for Corinthians), both with 18 goals. In 2017, he was also the country's isolated top scorer amongst players of the top division, with 32 goals.

Flamengo
On 1 February 2018, Flamengo announced Dourado's signing paying the sum of R$11million (around US$3.47 million and €2.79 million) to acquire 75% of his economic rights.

Henan Jianye
On 1 March 2019, Dourado joined Chinese Super League club Henan Jianye. Two days later, in the opening game of the 2019 Chinese Super League season, Dourado scored his first goal for Henan in his debut in a 1-1 draw against Dalian Professional, then tragically broke his leg after a foul by Qin Sheng, effectively ended his season after just one game. 

On 26 July 2020, Dourado made his comeback by scoring twice in a 4-3 defeat against Jiangsu Suning in the opening game of the 2020 Chinese Super League season.

On 21 August 2022, during a Chinese Super League game between Wuhan Yangtze River and Henan Songshan Longmen, Dourado deliberately knocked referee Ma Ning over after a heated quarrel between the two, and was subsequently sent off for violent conduct. The game finished 2-2.  Five days later, the Chinese FA announced a 12-month suspension to Dourado, which was the severest penalty in the history of Chinese Super League.  On 24 November 2022, as a result of the suspension, Dourado was released from Henan.

Return to Palmeiras (loan)
On 24 July 2019 he accepted his return to Palmeiras on a 6 months loan deal.

Career statistics

Club
.

Honours

Individual
Campeonato Brasileiro Série A Top scorer: 2017
Campeonato Brasileiro Série A Team of the year: 2017

References

External links

1989 births
Living people
Brazilian footballers
Footballers from São Paulo
Association football forwards
Campeonato Brasileiro Série A players
Campeonato Brasileiro Série C players
Campeonato Brasileiro Série D players
Chinese Super League players
Clube Atlético Lemense players
União São João Esporte Clube players
Esporte Clube Santo André players
Associação Chapecoense de Futebol players
Mogi Mirim Esporte Clube players
Santos FC players
Associação Portuguesa de Desportos players
Sociedade Esportiva Palmeiras players
Cruzeiro Esporte Clube players
Fluminense FC players
CR Flamengo footballers
Primeira Liga players
Vitória S.C. players
Henan Songshan Longmen F.C. players
Brazilian expatriate footballers
Brazilian expatriate sportspeople in Portugal
Brazilian expatriate sportspeople in China
Expatriate footballers in Portugal
Expatriate footballers in China